Asnawi Mangkualam Bahar (born 4 October 1999) is an Indonesian professional footballer who plays for K League 2 club Jeonnam Dragons and the Indonesia national team. Mainly playing as a right-back, he can also be deployed as a right wing-back or a defensive midfielder.

He has been considered one of the country's most gifted and promising footballers of his generation, together with fellow players such as Elkan Baggott, Witan Sulaeman, Pratama Arhan and Egy Maulana Vikri.

Club career

Persiba Balikpapan
After spending years in the youth squads of PSM Makassar, Asnawi joined Persiba Balikpapan for the 2016 Indonesia Soccer Championship A (a temporary tournament that replaced the defunct Indonesian Super League after the PSSI schism that led to the 2015 FIFA suspension on Indonesia). He soon became the youngest player to score in the competition, as he netted a goal at just 17 years and five days in a match against Bali United F.C. at Kapten I Wayan Dipta Stadium.

PSM Makassar
After Liga 1 (Indonesia) emerged as the stable football competition in the country, Asnawi in 2017 returned to PSM Makassar, where he made his debut against Persela Lamongan in the Indonesia President's Cup, the league's pre-season tournament.

Despite his young age, he rapidly established himself as one of the club's most talented and promising players, thanks to his versatility and his technical skills.

Ansan Greeners
In January 2021, Asnawi joined K League 2 side Ansan Greeners on a permanent deal. In the process, Ansan Greeners became the first K League team to ever register a Southeast Asian player, while Mangkualam itself became the first Indonesian footballer to ever play in the national system.

Upon signing for the South Korean club, the player revealed that the head coach of the Indonesian national team at the time, Shin Tae-yong, reportedly convinced him to pursue an opportunity abroad. The transfer also gained attention from Ansan's local Indonesian community and domestic fans in general, with the club's official social media accounts receiving a significant increase in the number of their followers.

After being unavailable for the first games of the season, due to COVID-19 self-isolation rules, Asnawi made his debut for Ansan, playing the entirety of a 1–0 win against K4 League club Yangpyeong in the local FA Cup.
On 3 April 2021, he made his league debut, playing 61 minutes in a 1–1 draw against Busan IPark.

On 23 July 2022, Asnawi scored his first league goal for Ansan Greeners in a 3–1 win against Gimpo at the Ansan Wa Stadium. Eight days later, he scored again in a 3–0 league win over Jeonnam Dragons.

Jeonnam Dragons 
On 27 January 2023, Asnawi officially joined fellow K League 2 side Jeonnam Dragons on a permanent deal.

International career
Often being a key player for Indonesia national Under-16, Under-19 and Under-23 squads. 

Asnawi made his international debut for the senior team on 21 March 2017, when he got on the pitch as a substitute during a friendly match against Myanmar. In the process, he broke a record for the youngest player to win an international senior cap for Indonesia, at the age of 17 years and 167 days. Later, this record was broken by Ronaldo Kwateh at the age of 17 years and 104 days on 27 January 2022. He was part of the Under-23 squad that won silver in the 2019 Southeast Asian Games in the Philippines and voted into the tournament's best eleven. 

In November 2021, Indonesian coach, Shin Tae-yong called Asnawi up to the full national side, for the friendly matches in Turkey against Afghanistan and Myanmar. In December 2021, he was named in Indonesian's squad for the 2020 AFF Championship in Singapore.
On 12 December 2021, Asnawi scored his first international goal with a penalty against Laos at 2020 AFF Championship and Asnawi also providing the assist for Irfan Jaya to score Indonesia's second goal in an eventual 1–5 win.

Personal life 
Mangkualam is the son of Bahar Muharram, a former Indonesian footballer himself currently serving as an assistant coach at PSM Makassar, the club Mangkualam played for between 2017 and 2021.

Career statistics

Club

International

International goals
International under-23 goals

International senior goals

Honours

Club
PSM Makassar
 Piala Indonesia: 2019

International 
Indonesia U-16
 AFF U-16 Youth Championship runner-up: 2013
Indonesia U-19
 AFF U-19 Youth Championship third place: 2017, 2018
Indonesia U-23
 Southeast Asian Games  Bronze medal: 2017, 2021
 Southeast Asian Games  Silver medal: 2019
 AFF U-22 Youth Championship: 2019
Indonesia
 AFF Championship runner-up: 2020

Individual
 Piala Indonesia Best Young Player: 2019
 Liga 1 Team of the Season: 2019
Indonesian Soccer Awards: Favorite Young Footballer 2019
 K League 2  Player of the Month: April 2021'''

References

External links
 
 

1999 births
Living people
People from Makassar
Sportspeople from South Sulawesi
Indonesian Muslims
Indonesian footballers
Liga 1 (Indonesia) players
K League 2 players
Persiba Balikpapan players
PSM Makassar players
Ansan Greeners FC players
Jeonnam Dragons players
Indonesia youth international footballers
Indonesia international footballers
Association football midfielders
Sportspeople from Makassar
Indonesian expatriate footballers
Expatriate footballers in South Korea
Southeast Asian Games bronze medalists for Indonesia
Southeast Asian Games medalists in football
Competitors at the 2017 Southeast Asian Games
Competitors at the 2019 Southeast Asian Games
Southeast Asian Games silver medalists for Indonesia
Competitors at the 2021 Southeast Asian Games
21st-century Indonesian people